Greben (Cyrillic: Гребен, meaning "ridge" or literally "comb") is a mountain in southeastern Serbia, with a small section of the southwestern ridge in Bulgaria. 
It is named after a large karst ridge that runs along its spine. Greben rises near the village of Poganovo in Serbia, in the municipality of Dimitrovgrad, and extends southeast towards the Bulgarian village of Vrabcha. Prior to the Treaty of Neuilly of 1919, after the First World War, the area was part of Bulgaria. 

Its highest peak Beženište (or Dziglina livada) stands at an elevation of 1,338 meters above sea level. The highest peak that falls within Bulgaria is Dragovski kamak (Драговски камък), at 1,118 m. Due to the characteristic pyramidal shape of its north face, Dragovski kamak is referred to as the "Matterhorn of Tran". 

With nearby Vlaška planina, Greben forms the attractive canyon (Poganovsko ždrelo) of the Jerma (Erma) river.

Greben Hill in the Antarctica was named after the mountain by the Bulgarian Antarctic Place-names Commission.

Gallery

References

External links
 Photo tour over Greben 

Mountains of Serbia
Mountains of Bulgaria
Landforms of Pernik Province
Rhodope mountain range